is a Japanese video game designer, director, and producer, and business executive. He is a senior executive officer at Nintendo, where he is known for his work within their Mario and The Legend of Zelda series.

Since 2013, Koizumi is also part of the board of directors of Nintendo’s subsidiary 1-UP Studio as one of its representative directors, and since October 2022, Koizumi is part of the board of directors of Nintendo's subsidiary Nintendo Pictures as one of its directors.

Biography

Early life
Koizumi was born in Mishima, Shizuoka on April 29, 1968. He played his first video game, Super Mario Bros. 2, at the age of 21 when he borrowed a friend's Family Computer console. A graduate from the Visual Concept Planning Department of Osaka University of Arts, Koizumi studied film, drama, animation and, to a lesser extent, storyboarding. He had originally intended to become a film director but applied at Nintendo instead to pursue his goal of creating a kind of drama only experienced in video games. The company's close proximity to his university also played a role in his career choice.

Nintendo
After Koizumi had joined Nintendo in April 1991, he was assigned to work on the manual for the action-adventure game, The Legend of Zelda: A Link to the Past for the Super Nintendo Entertainment System, for which he did the art, layout and writing. In the process, he conceived the game's backstory and the designs of the three goddesses and the star sign associated with them. For the sequel, The Legend of Zelda: Link's Awakening, he was again tasked with designing the manual. However, since work on the game had just begun, Koizumi wound up creating its entire story and came up with plot ideas such as the island in a dream. He also worked on the event design for the interactions with the villagers, wrote the owl's and the Wind Fish's lines and designed the bosses' behavioral patterns. Koizumi later experimented with a polygonal, side-scrolling remake of Zelda II: The Adventure of Link. Developed for the Super Nintendo Entertainment System, the prototype was based on chanbara action, a type of Japanese sword fighting. With Super Mario 64, Koizumi became assistant director and animated the 3D models, among others working on Mario's swimming movements in cooperation with director Shigeru Miyamoto.

While developing Super Mario 64, Nintendo's employees devised rough concepts of a three-dimensional The Legend of Zelda game with a bigger focus on puzzles and less pronounced action elements. Koizumi wrote several notes on sword battles and combat with multiple opponents. When he joined Toru Osawa and Jin Ikeda, he was the third staff member to work on the game that would become The Legend of Zelda: Ocarina of Time. Koizumi consulted his earlier notes and tried to inject leftover ideas from Super Mario 64 into this new Zelda installment. On the lookout for inspiration on chanbara action, Osawa suggested a visit to Toei Kyoto Studio Park, a film studio theme park. There, Osawa, Koizumi and Ikeda entered a playhouse where several ninjas and a main samurai were staging a show. Koizumi observed how only one of the ninjas would attack the main samurai at a time while the others remained in a waiting pattern, which proved to be the solution to designing battles with multiple opponents. Osawa noticed how a ninja using a kusarigama weapon would move around the main samurai in circles and never lose track of his opponent. Both of these observations became the basis for the Z targeting system used in Ocarina of Time. Koizumi replaced the simple triangle the team had implemented to mark the player's focus with a fairy that would change colors based on the friendly or hostile nature of the Z target. Furthermore, he was in charge of the player character Link and designed other characters such as the horse Epona. He also worked on the 3D environments, the camera system, the items and some of the event design, such as the scenes where the player overhears the conversations of other characters.

Following Ocarina of Time, Koizumi was designing a "cops and robbers"-style board game that had the player catch a criminal over the course of a week in-game, or roughly equivalent to an hour in real time. However, he was pulled off the project and asked to help develop the sequel to Ocarina of Time, The Legend of Zelda: Majora's Mask. Koizumi carried over his "cops and robbers" idea with the time limit and expanded it into a world threatened by a falling moon after he had daydreamed about such a scenario. The concept was corroborated by Miyamoto's wish to have a "compact" Zelda that could be played over and over again, and the ideas eventually evolved into a system with a three-day time loop. Koizumi was again placed in charge of the game's player characters. He also wrote many of the scheduled events involving the villagers of Clock Town, for which he tried to depict the characters' lives as realistically as possible. Many of the serious elements in Majora's Mask came from Koizumi, which his coworker Eiji Aonuma countered by introducing more lighthearted portions in the areas he was in charge of.

In 2003, Koizumi switched to Nintendo's Tokyo Software Development Department and directed the 2D platformer Donkey Kong Jungle Beat. The game's side-scrolling nature sprang from Koizumi's attempt to overcome problems with complex camera controls in 3D titles. These efforts continued in his next title, Super Mario Galaxy. The game's spherical levels eliminated the possibility of the player getting lost or the need for adjusting the camera when reaching the end of a flat surface. Koizumi directed Super Mario Galaxy and was heavily involved in the creation of its story, deciding on the inclusion of the optional fairytale book that tells the characters' backstory. Following this, he was promoted to producer and was manager of Tokyo Software Development Group No. 2 within the company's Entertainment Analysis & Development Division. In September 2015, he became Deputy General Manager of the newly formed Entertainment Planning & Development Division. Koizumi also served as General Producer of Nintendo's 2017 video game console, the Nintendo Switch. He also succeeded Satoru Iwata as the international host of the Nintendo Direct video presentations in 2017, and has been doing so since the live streamed Nintendo Switch Presentation, which took place on January 12, 2017.

Game design

Koizumi is a protégé of Shigeru Miyamoto and often draws his ideas from real-world influences such as hiking. When creating fictional worlds, he tries to surprise players with visually impressive environments and difficult gameplay mechanics while still ensuring "ease of use", that is effortless navigation and control. He said that most of his time on a video game is spent working on player characters and their abilities in order to strike a balance between "fun and complexity" in control. Koizumi mentioned tempo and rhythm as some of the most important elements of a Mario game, whereas he gave anticipation of the awaiting challenges as a crucial factor in a Zelda title. Unlike Miyamoto, Koizumi often tries to introduce story elements to the video games he works on. He trains his staff by hinting at the direction they should take rather than just giving them the solution to a problem.

Works

References

External links

 

1968 births
Japanese video game businesspeople
Japanese video game designers
Japanese video game directors
Japanese video game producers
Living people
Nintendo people
Osaka University of Arts alumni
People from Shizuoka Prefecture
Video game artists